Man from Sonora is a 1951 American Western film directed by Lewis D. Collins and written by Maurice Tombragel. The film stars Johnny Mack Brown, Phyllis Coates, Lyle Talbot, House Peters Jr., Lee Roberts and Dennis Moore. The film was released on March 11, 1951, by Monogram Pictures.

Plot

Cast          
Johnny Mack Brown as Johnny Mack Brown
Phyllis Coates as Cinthy Allison
Lyle Talbot as Sheriff Frank Casey
House Peters Jr. as Ed Hooper
Lee Roberts as Duke Mantell
Dennis Moore as Wesley Carrol
John Merton as Pete
Stanley Price as Spence

References

External links
 

1951 films
1950s English-language films
American Western (genre) films
1951 Western (genre) films
Monogram Pictures films
Films directed by Lewis D. Collins
American black-and-white films
1950s American films